Amy Loveman (16 May 1881 – 11 December 1955) was an American editor and critic, best known for her work as a founding editor of the Saturday Review of Literature and for her work at the Book-of-the-Month Club.

She was responsible for more than 800 contributions to the Saturday Review. According to the Jewish Women's Archive, Loveman was "the ideal book review editor" who had a "vital role in the Book-of-the-Month Club, selecting great books to introduce to new readers."

Selected publications

 Saturday Papers: Essays on Literature from “The Literary Review,” with Henry Seidel Canby and William Rose Benét (1921).
 Designed for Reading: An Anthology Drawn from “The Saturday Review of Literature,” 1924–1934, with Henry Seidel Canby, William Rose Benét, Christopher Morley, and May Lamberton Becker (1934).
 I’m Looking for a Book (1936).
 Varied Harvest: A Miscellany of Writing by Barnard College Women, with Fredrica Barach and Marjorie M. Mayer (1953).

References

External links 

 Finding aid to Amy Loveman letters at Columbia University. Rare Book & Manuscript Library.

1881 births
1955 deaths
American editors
American literary critics
American women editors
American women critics
Women literary critics
People from New York City